The Bear Sanctuary Belitsa (formerly Dancing Bears Park Belitsa) is a project of Four Paws and the Brigitte Bardot Foundation near the town of Belitsa in South West Bulgaria and provides mistreated and neglected brown bears with a home.

History & objective 
Since 2000, the park provides a home for brown bears that were kept in inadequate conditions, especially for those bears that have been raised and trained as dancing bears. When the sanctuary was established in 2000, there were more than 20 dancing bears in Bulgaria and Serbia. The animal welfare organisation Four Paws took measures against illegal practices, and in cooperation with French Brigitte Bardot Foundation, established the park. As there are no more dancing bears to rescue, the name changed to Bear Sanctuary Belitsa in May 2022.

Location & size 
Dancing Bears Park Belitsa is located in Rila Mountain at about 180 kilometres south of Sofia, 12 kilometres from town Belitsa and about 35 kilometres from Bansko. The whole area of the sanctuary comprises 120,000 square metres, divided into seven open air enclosures for the bears. The sanctuary offers dense forests and hills for roaming and seclusion, ponds for swimming and artificial dens.

Number of bears & their origin 
Since 2000, 31 former dancing bears from Bulgaria, Serbia and Albania, 4 bears from Bulgarian zoos and 2 young bears originating from private keeping conditions were rescued and housed in the park. In January 2019 there are 25 bears living in the several open-air enclosures of the sanctuary. The first three bears that were rescued and transferred to the park in 2000 were "Kalina", "Mariana" and "Stefan". In 2007 the last three dancing bears of Bulgaria were transferred and in 2009 the last three dancing bears from Serbia were also accommodated in the sanctuary.

Education & visitor service 
Dancing Bears Park Belitsa is open from April until December. The guided tours offer visitors information about the conditions in which the bears suffered before they were rescued, as well as to raise awareness about the main natural requirements of brown bear species and its conservation.

See also 
 Bear Sanctuary Prishtina
 Bear Sanctuary Domazhyr
 Bear Sanctuary Ninh Binh
 Bear Sanctuary Müritz

References

External links
 Four Paws: project Dancing Bears Park Belitsa
 https://www.bearsanctuary-belitsa.org/

Bear sanctuaries
Tourist attractions in Blagoevgrad Province